3 Park Avenue is a mixed-use office building and high school located on Park Avenue in Manhattan, New York City that was built in 1973. The building, surrounded on three sides by a plaza, is categorized as a Midtown South address in the Kips Bay, Manhattan, Murray Hill, and Rose Hill neighborhoods. It is located between East 33rd and 34th Streets, close to the 33rd Street subway station, an entrance to which is built into the building.

Architecture
The building was designed by Shreve, Lamb and Harmon, designers of the Empire State Building. Rosenwasser/Grossman Consulting Engineers, P.C. is listed as the structural engineering firm for the building in 2014. The 42-story building consists of a combination of commercial tenants and several specialty schools including Unity Center for Urban Technologies, Manhattan Academy for Arts and Language, and Murray Hill Academy. The Norman Thomas High School was formerly located in the building.

The building is notable for its diagonal alignment and the bright light colored bricks used for its construction and the same bricks are used for the small plaza at the building's main entrance. The sculpture was Marantz's last outdoor work before his death.

The entrance to the school is on the East 33rd Street side of the building, where arcade and plaza space (which surrounds the three sides of the building facing the street) exists; although a bench is situated at the entrance, New York State Penal Law prohibits trespassing. In 2000, the space on the 34th Street side was almost identical to the 33rd Street arcade and plaza, but lacked a bench and sign.

History
Prior to the construction of 3 Park Avenue, the armory of the 71st Regiment, New York National Guard was located at the address. The first armory of the 71st Regiment burnt down in 1902 and a replacement was completed in 1905 on a slightly larger section of land. The architectural firm of Clinton and Russell designed the second armory and in 1935 it was described as "Manhattan’s ugly old brownstone" by Time magazine, which was a reflection of a wider perception of the structure. The armory was eventually demolished during the 1960s and a decade passed before the site was redeveloped. 

In 2000, the building was owned by Three Park Avenue Building Company LP. By 2014, the property formed part of the Cohen Brothers Realty Corporation's portfolio in June 2014.

The building's lobby was renovated in 2001. In 2016, Cohen Brothers retained César Pelli's Pelli Clarke Pelli architects to design a renovation of the lobby. In December 2018, Citibank provided $182 million in debt to refinance the building.

Tenants
, the list of tenants in the building includes:

 IEEE Communications Society – 17th floor 
 adMarketplace – 27th floor
 Mimeo, Inc – 22nd Floor 
 Major League Gaming – 32nd floor
 JCDecaux North America – 33rd floor
 TransPerfect – 39th floor

In popular culture
The building is featured in the 2005 HBO documentary Left of the Dial, a film about the Air America radio station, a previous tenant of the building.

See also

References

External links
 Emporis: 3 Park Avenue

1979 establishments in New York City
Murray Hill, Manhattan
Office buildings completed in 1975
Skyscraper office buildings in Manhattan
Park Avenue
Privately owned public spaces
34th Street (Manhattan)